Mikhail Borisovich Piotrovsky is the Director of the Hermitage Museum in Saint Petersburg, Russia.

Life and career
He was born in Yerevan in the Armenian Soviet Socialist Republic on 9 December 1944 to Boris Piotrovsky, a notable Orientalist and himself the future Director of the Hermitage Museum, and Armenian mother Hripsime Djanpoladjian.

At the Leningrad University, Mikhail Piotrovsky obtained a doctorate in Arabic linguistics. After graduating in 1967, he worked as an interpreter in Yemen and took part in archaeological exploration of the Caucasus. After his father's death in 1990, Piotrovsky was appointed Director of the Hermitage in his stead.

Following the collapse of the Soviet Union, Piotrovsky advocated the opening of the Hermitage collections to the wider world, which resulted in the establishment of the Hermitage Rooms in Somerset House, Hermitage Amsterdam and the Guggenheim Hermitage Museum. His tenure was not entirely free of scandals, however. After the museum announced in July 2006 that 221 minor items, including jewelry, Orthodox icons, silverware and richly enameled objects, had been stolen by one of the museum officials, there were calls for Piotrovsky's resignation.

After 2022 Russian invasion of Ukraine, Piotrovsky spoke of the importance of cultural bridges and made sure major loans avoided seizure and were returned to Russia. He spoke out against the cancellation of Russian culture but avoided direct references to the war, even as museum partners and international supporters suspended ties. Four months later, Piotrovsky has opened up about the war. He describes Russian culture as an important export, similar to the country's war in Ukraine. "Our recent exhibitions abroad are just a powerful cultural offensive. If you want, a kind of 'special operation', which a lot of people don't like. But we are coming. And no one can be allowed to interfere with our offensive".

Awards and honors
Piotrovsky has been invested with numerous orders and medals, both Russian and foreign, including the Order of the Rising Sun (Japan) and the Order of Honor (Russia). He has also had a minor planet named after him. Piotrovsky has been Chair of the Board of the First Channel of the Russian television since 2001.

On 1 October 2009, Piotrovsky received the Woodrow Wilson Award for Public Service from the Kennan Institute.

References 

1944 births
Living people
Soviet expatriates in Yemen
Russian orientalists
Armenian orientalists
Russian people of Armenian descent
Saint Petersburg State University alumni
Corresponding Members of the Russian Academy of Sciences
Full Members of the Russian Academy of Arts
Directors of the Hermitage Museum
People from Yerevan
Knights of the Order of Orange-Nassau
Grand Cordons of the Order of the Rising Sun
Recipients of the Order of Alexander Nevsky
Recipients of the Order of Merit of the Italian Republic
Recipients of the Order of Merit of the Republic of Poland
Recipients of the Order of Honour (Russia)
Recipients of the Order "For Merit to the Fatherland", 2nd class
Officiers of the Légion d'honneur